The Chamber of Peers of Portugal, alternatively translatable as the House of Lords and formally styled the Chamber of the Most Worthy Peers of the Realm (Portuguese: Câmara dos Pares or Câmara dos Digníssimos Pares do Reino), was the upper house of the Cortes Gerais, the legislature of the Kingdom of Portugal during most of the constitutional monarchy period. Members of the Chamber were Peers of the Realm, appointed directly at the pleasure of the Portuguese monarch.

History

It was established before the Liberal Wars. The monarch appointed a number of the highest nobility to the Chamber. It was composed of 90 peers who did not have a hereditary right to sit by descent, but were nominated by the monarch.

The Chamber existed from 1826-1838 and again from 1842-1910, when it was known as the Chamber of Peers of the Realm (Câmara dos Pares do Reino).

One of the members was The 1st Duke of Albuquerque (1815-1890).

The Chamber met at the São Bento Palace. The successor of the Chamber was the Senate.

References

Defunct upper houses
Government of Portugal
Portuguese monarchy

Peerage